Crafton is a borough in Allegheny County, Pennsylvania, United States, west of downtown Pittsburgh. The population grew from 1,927 in 1900 to 4,583 in 1910 and to 7,163 in 1940. The population was 6,099 at the 2020 census.

History
Crafton is named after James S. Craft, a frontier attorney who was granted land near the "forks of the Ohio" in present-day Oakland. The sale of this land part financed purchases of land in the Chartiers valley. Charles Craft, son of James, divided the land into lots on the death of his father and submitted it to the Allegheny County Courthouse as Crafton. Following a period of building, the borough was incorporated on January 8, 1892, with Charles as the first burgess.

Crafton was linked to downtown Pittsburgh by trolley in 1896. The service ended when the Fort Pitt Bridge was built without trolley tracks.

Geography
Crafton is located at  (40.433869, -80.068146).

Surrounding and adjacent neighborhoods
Crafton has six land borders, including Ingram to the north and the Pittsburgh neighborhoods of  Crafton Heights to the northeast, Westwood to the east, Oakwood and East Carnegie to the south, and Fairywood to the northwest.  Across Chartiers Creek, Crafton runs adjacent with Thornburg to the west and Rosslyn Farms to the southwest.

Demographics

As of the census of 2000, there were 6,706 people, 3,079 households, and 1,613 families residing in the borough. The population density was 5,916.0 people per square mile (2,291.3/km2). There were 3,344 housing units at an average density of 2,950.1 per square mile (1,142.6/km2). The racial makeup of the borough was 95.50% White, 2.74% African American, 0.10% Native American, 0.60% Asian, 0.07% Pacific Islander, 0.15% from other races, and 0.84% from two or more races. Hispanic or Latino of any race were 0.57% of the population.

There were 3,080 households, out of which 24.9% had children under the age of 18 living with them, 38.2% were married couples living together, 10.6% had a female householder with no husband present, and 47.6% were non-families. 40.2% of all households were made up of individuals, and 14.3% had someone living alone who was 65 years of age or older. The average household size was 2.17 and the average family size was 3.01.

In the borough the population was spread out, with 21.6% under the age of 18, 8.6% from 18 to 24, 32.5% from 25 to 44, 22.6% from 45 to 64, and 14.8% who were 65 years of age or older. The median age was 38 years. For every 100 females, there were 90.1 males. For every 100 females age 18 and over, there were 86.9 males.

The median income for a household in the borough was $38,323, and the median income for a family was $52,386. Males had a median income of $38,292 versus $24,497 for females. The per capita income for the borough was $21,441. About 3.4% of families and 6.9% of the population were below the poverty line, including 6.5% of those under age 18 and 6.2% of those age 65 or over.

Government and politics

Notable people
Bill Cowher, Former Pittsburgh Steelers head coach and current NFL analyst. Cowher is a native of Crafton and attended Carlynton High School.

Alpha L. Bowser (August 21, 1910 – July 13, 2003), United States Marine Corps lieutenant general. He was a combat veteran of World War II and the Korean War — decorated for his actions during the Battle of Iwo Jima and in the Battle of Chosin Reservoir.

Paul Shannon, Legendary Pittsburgh radio and television host.

Gallery

References

External links

 Crafton Borough (official site)

Populated places established in 1872
Pittsburgh metropolitan area
Boroughs in Allegheny County, Pennsylvania
1872 establishments in Pennsylvania